Bridgewater Commons is a fully enclosed shopping mall located in Bridgewater Township, New Jersey. The mall is located at the intersection of Route 22 and Route 202/206 and borders I-287.

The mall was expanded in 2005 and 2006 to include a lifestyle center called "The Village at Bridgewater Commons".  It is anchored by Maggiano's Little Italy. The Village contains 15 other stores and restaurants.
As of 2022, the mall is anchored by the traditional department store chains Bloomingdale's and Macy's. The mall features premier brands such as Abercrombie & Fitch, Aéropostale, J.Crew and PacSun. The mall also features an AMC Dine-In Theatre.

History
In the 1960s, a township redevelopment agency combined various plots of land in Bridgewater, and then it declared the entire area blighted so that the land could be sold to one developer. Bridgewater township signed a contract with The Hahn Company, a California-based mall-developer, in 1985. The Prudential's real estate division joined the development project later.

In 1986, R.H.Macy Co announced they would open a Macy's store in the shopping center, instead of the company's Bamberger's banner, as originally planned.  The company was in the process of retiring the Bamberger's brand and converting its Bamberger's stores to its Macy's banner. 

Bridgewater Commons opened on February 26, 1988 with anchor stores Macy's, Hahnes and Stern's. On June 18, 1988, a Disney Store opened, which was the first Disney Store located outside of California. On October 18, 1989, Hahnes converted to Lord & Taylor. 

Since opening, mall management and Somerset Medical Center have sponsored a HealthHike mall walking program to give walkers an indoors, secured, and climate-controlled environment in which to walk. Anyone can obtain a name tag to enter the mall starting at 6:30 a.m. Monday through Saturday and 9 a.m. Sunday. The program also includes a monthly meeting at 8:30 a.m. on the first Wednesday of each month from October through June to discuss health-related topics. Since opening, the mall has also featured an annual Christmas display and kids photo opportunity with Santa Claus in addition to a photo opportunity with the Easter Bunny around Easter time.

The mall complex pursued a major expansion in 1991 to add two eight-story office buildings to the complex, which would include . of office space and a 300-room hotel. The effort was initiated as part of a longstanding urban renewal project. By 2000, with a 347-room Bridgewater Marriott Hotel already under the construction, the mall's developers pushed ahead to develop the office towers planned for the complex. The two towers later opened, occupied mostly by Brother Industries and Sanofi-Aventis.

In 1993, Bridgewater Commons became one of the first malls in the state to ban smoking, joining 300 of 1800 malls nationwide that prohibited smoking on mall grounds.

In 2001, Macy's announced that two Stern's stores will close in the same year, and reopen as Bloomingdale's stores in 2002; Bridgewater was one of them. The other store that was affected was the Wayne location, located at the Willowbrook Mall.

In 2003, upscale seafood chain McCormick & Schmick's opened.

The Village at Bridgewater Commons, a lifestyle center adjacent to the mall's property, officially opened on Saturday, September 23, 2006 with two anchors: Crate & Barrel and Maggiano's Little Italy, which opened a month before.

As of November 2008, the Food Court has reopened after its extensive renovation. Some of the restaurants within have reopened as well.  

Throughout the year of 2010, Bridgewater Commons sought an increase in entertainment and restaurant occupants with The Cheesecake Factory opening on August 23, and both AMC Theatres and California Pizza Kitchen opening in November.  

On May 1, 2015, casual burger restaurant Shake Shack opened their first Central Jersey location in The Village occupying the space vacated by Coldwater Creek. This marked the chain’s third location in the state of New Jersey.  

On November 23, 2016, American restaurant chain Redstone American Grill opened their second New Jersey location in a pad next to California Pizza Kitchen.  

October 19, 2017, Mediterranean restaurant chain Cava opened their third New Jersey location at The Village in the former Brooks Brothers space.  

McCormick & Schmick's closed in January 2019 due to the expiration of their lease.  

Mexican food chain Uncle Julio’s opened their first NJ location in the space formerly occupied by McCormick & Schmick's on February 25, 2020.  

On August 27, 2020, Lord & Taylor announced they would liquidate and shutter all their remaining stores as the company declared bankruptcy.

In November 2021, Crate & Barrel, an anchor of The Village, declared its departure from the mall after they opted to not renew their lease. The township plans to re-zone the building to allow medical use to occupy the space after the popular furniture chain vacated.

In December 2022, the town council approved a zoning ordinance in the former Lord & Taylor anchor pad to attract entertainment and amusement establishments such as Topgolf or Dave & Buster's to occupy the vacant space.

In January 2023, Brazilian steakhouse chain Fogo de Chão announced that they will open three locations in NJ, including a venue at the mall.

References

External links
Official website
International Council of Shopping Centers: Bridgewater Commons

Buildings and structures in Somerset County, New Jersey
Shopping malls in New Jersey
Shopping malls established in 1988
Brookfield Properties
Tourist attractions in Somerset County, New Jersey
Shopping malls in the New York metropolitan area
Bridgewater Township, New Jersey